Bulbophyllum acuminatum is a species of orchid in the genus Bulbophyllum. This orchid is commonly known as the tapering flower bulbophyllum and can be found in Southeast Asia near Thailand, Burma, and Malaysia.

References
The Bulbophyllum-Checklist
The Internet Orchid Species Photo Encyclopedia

acuminatum
Plants described in 1896